The Women's 1500 metres competition at the 1976 Summer Olympics in Montreal, Quebec, Canada was held at the Olympic Stadium on 26–30 July.

Competition format
The Women's 1500m competition consisted of heats (Round 1), Semifinals and a Final. The three fastest competitors from each race in the heats plus the next two fastest overall qualified for the Semifinals. The four fastest competitors from each of the Semifinal races plus the next fastest overall advanced to the Final.

Records
Prior to the competition, the existing World and Olympic records were as follows.

Results

Round 1
Qual. rule: first 4 of each heat (Q) plus the next two fastest times (q) qualified.

Heat 1

Heat 2

Heat 3

Heat 4

Semifinals

Heat 1

Heat 2

Final

References

External links
 Official Olympic Report , la84foundation.org. Retrieved August 20, 2012.

Athletics at the 1976 Summer Olympics
1500 metres at the Olympics
1976 in women's athletics
Women's events at the 1976 Summer Olympics